Edivaldo Martíns da Fonseca, best known as Edivaldo (born in Volta Redonda, Rio de Janeiro State, April 13, 1962 – died in Boituva, São Paulo State, January 13, 1993) was a Brazilian footballer who played as a forward.

In his career, which started in 1982, he played for Atlético Mineiro, Palmeiras, São Paulo, Taquaritinga (his last club), in Japan with Gamba Osaka, and in Mexico with Puebla. For the Brazil national team he played in three matches (April 1986 to July 1989) without scoring a goal, and was in the squad for the 1986 FIFA World Cup. He died in the Castelo Branco highway disaster in São Paulo, at 30 years of age.

Club statistics

International career statistics

References

External links

1962 births
1993 deaths
People from Volta Redonda
Brazilian footballers
Brazilian expatriate footballers
Association football forwards
Clube Atlético Mineiro players
Sociedade Esportiva Palmeiras players
São Paulo FC players
Gamba Osaka players
Club Puebla players
Campeonato Brasileiro Série A players
Liga MX players
J1 League players
1986 FIFA World Cup players
Expatriate footballers in Mexico
Expatriate footballers in Japan
Brazil international footballers
Road incident deaths in Brazil
Sportspeople from Rio de Janeiro (state)